EBHS may refer to:
 Eagle Butte High School, Dunmore, Alberta, Canada
 East Bakersfield High School, Bakersfield, California, United States
 East Brunswick High School, East Brunswick Township, New Jersey, United States
 Epping Boys High School, Epping, New South Wales, Australia